Riccò's law, discovered by astronomer Annibale Riccò, is one of several laws that describe a human's ability to visually detect targets on a uniform background. This law explains the visual relationship between a target angular area A and target luminance increment  required for detection when that target is unresolved (that is, is too small in the field of view to make out different parts of it).  The law is given by:

where  is a constant (for a given background, see below).

For constant background luminance , the equation can be restated as

 
with a different constant . The fraction  is referred to as  Weber contrast C.

Riccò's law is applicable for regions where the target being detected is unresolved.  The resolution of the human eye (the receptive field size) is approximately one arc-minute in the center (the fovea center) but the size increases in peripheral vision. Riccò's law is applicable for targets of angular area less than the size of the receptive field.  This region is variable based on the amount of background luminance.  Riccò's law is based on the fact that within a receptive field, the light energy (or the number of photons per second) required to lead to the target being detected is summed over the area and is thus proportional to the luminance and to the area. Therefore, the contrast threshold required for detection is proportional to the signal-to-noise ratio multiplied by the noise divided by the area.  This leads to the above equation.

The "constant" K is actually a function of the background luminance B to which the eye is assumed to be adapted. It has been shown by Andrew Crumey that for unconstrained vision (that is, observers could either look directly or at the target or avert their gaze) an accurate empirical formula for K is

where c1, c2 are constants taking different values for scotopic and photopic vision. For low B this approximates to the De Vries-Rose Law for threshold contrast C

However, at very low background luminance (less than 10−5 candela per square metre) the threshold value for the illuminance

is a constant (around 10−9 lux) and does not depend on B. In that case

or

Ricco's Areas
Ricco’s Areas are any areas of the retina where cells can detect a visual stimulus at threshold. The areas will change in location and size depending on the type of cells, the light conditions and the type of stimulus.

See also
Spatial summation
Weber's law
Bloch's law (termporal summation)

References

Photometry